Non-marine molluscs of New Zealand include gastropods, such as land snails, and freshwater molluscs (or shellfish), such as freshwater mussels. Among the best known are the large native forest snails such as the Paryphanta (kauri snails) and Powelliphanta.

Systematic list

Freshwater gastropods 

Tateidae
 Catapyrgus jamyi Verhaegen & Haase, 2021
 Catapyrgus sororius Haase, 2008
 Obtusopyrgus farri Verhaegen & Haase, 2021
 Opacuincola gretathunbergae Verhaegen & Haase, 2021
 Opacuincola lisannea Verhaegen & Haase, 2021
 Opacuincola mete Haase, 2008 with the subspecies O. mete kahurangi Verhaegen & Haase, 2021

Latiidae - only one genus Latia is endemic to the North Island
 Latia climoi Starobogatov, 1986 - type species
 Latia lateralis (Gould, 1852)
 Latia neritoides Gray, 1850

Lymnaeidae

Planorbidae
 Planorbis kahuica Finlay & Laws, 1931

Land gastropods 

Hydrocenidae
 Omphalorissa purchasi (Pfeiffer, 1862)

Orthalicidae
 Placostylus ambagiosus Suter, 1906

Pupinidae
 Cytora annectens (Powell, 1948)
 Cytora aranea (Powell, 1928)
 Cytora brooki Marshall & Barker, 2007
 Cytora calva (Hutton, 1882)
 Cytora chiltoni (Suter, 1896)
 Cytora climoi Marshall & Barker, 2007
 Cytora cytora (Gray, 1850)
 Cytora depressa N. Gardner, 1968
 Cytora fasciata (Suter, 1894)
 Cytora filicosta (Powell, 1948)
 Cytora gardneri Marshall & Barker, 2007
 Cytora goulstonei Marshall & Barker, 2007
 Cytora hazelwoodi Marshall & Barker, 2007
 Cytora hedleyi (Suter, 1894)
 Cytora hirsutissima (Powell, 1951)
 Cytora hispida N. Gardner, 1967
 Cytora houhora Marshall & Barker, 2007
 Cytora jamiesoni Marshall & Barker, 2007
 Cytora kahurangi Marshall & Barker, 2007
 Cytora kakano Marshall & Barker, 2007
 Cytora kamura Marshall & Barker, 2007
 Cytora kerrana N. Gardner, 1968
 Cytora lignaria (L. Pfeiffer, 1857)
 Cytora malleata Marshall & Barker, 2007
 Cytora maui Marshall & Barker, 2007
 Cytora mayhillae Marshall & Barker, 2007
 Cytora minor Marshall & Barker, 2007
 Cytora motu Marshall & Barker, 2007
 Cytora pakotai Marshall & Barker, 2007
 Cytora pallida (Hutton, 1883)
 Cytora pannosa (Hutton, 1882)
 Cytora paparoa Marshall & Barker, 2007
 Cytora parrishi Marshall & Barker, 2007
 Cytora rakiura Marshall & Barker, 2007
 Cytora septentrionalis (Suter, 1907)
 Cytora solitaria (Powell, 1935)
 Cytora taipa Marshall & Barker, 2007
 Cytora tawhiti Marshall & Barker, 2007
 Cytora tepakiensis N. Gardner, 1967
 Cytora tokerau Marshall & Barker, 2007
 Cytora torquillum (Suter, 1894)
 Cytora tuarua Marshall & Barker, 2007
 Liarea aupouria Powell, 1954: Liarea aupouria aupouria and Liarea aupouria tara
 Liarea bicarinata (Suter, 1907)
 Liarea egea (Gray, 1850): Liarea egea egea and Liarea egea tessellata
 Liarea hochstetteri (Pfeiffer, 1861): Liarea hochstetteri alta, Liarea hochstetteri carinella and Liarea hochstetteri hochstetteri
 Liarea lepida (Suter, 1904)
 Liarea ornata Powell, 1954
 Liarea turriculata (Pfeiffer, 1855): Liarea turriculata partula, Liarea turriculata turriculata and Liarea turriculata waipoua

Punctidae
 Laoma leimonias (Gray, 1850)
 Paralaoma servilis (Shuttleworth, 1852)
 Phrixgnathus celia Hutton, 1883

Rhytididae
 Paryphanta busbyi (Gray, 1840)
 Paryphanta watti Powell, 1946
 Powelliphanta spp. - all species of the genus Powelliphanta are endemic to New Zealand
 Rhytida spp. - all species of the genus Rhytida are endemic to New Zealand
 Rhytida greenwoodi (Gray, 1850)
 Schizoglossa spp. - all species of the genus Schizoglossa are endemic to New Zealand
 Wainuia spp. - all species of the genus Wainuia are endemic to New Zealand

Charopidae
 Allodiscus dimorphus (Reeve, 1852)
 Alsolemia longstaffae (Suter, 1913)
 Charopa coma (Gray, 1843)
 Fectola infecta (Reeve, 1852)
 Flammulina zebra (Le Guillou, 1842)
 Mitodon wairarapa (Suter, 1890)
 Mocella eta (Pfeiffer, 1853)
 Neophenacohelix giveni (Cumber, 1961)
 Otoconcha dimidiata (L. Pfeiffer, 1853)
 Phacussa helmsi (Hutton, 1882)
 Phenacohelix pilula (Reeve, 1852)
 Ranfurlya constanceae Suter, 1903
 Suteria ide (Gray, 1850)
 Therasia thaisa Hutton, 1883

Helicidae

Bivalvia

Hyriidae
 Cucumerunio websteri (Simpson, 1902)

See also

 List of marine molluscs of New Zealand
 List of non-marine molluscs of Australia
 Fauna of New Zealand

References

Further reading
 Hutton F. W. (1880). Manual of the New Zealand Mollusca. A systematic and descriptive catalogue of the marine and land shells, and of the soft mollusks and Polyzoa of New Zealand and the adjacent islands.
 Suter H. (1913). Manual of the New Zealand Mollusca Wellington.
 Powell A. W. B. (1979). New Zealand Mollusca, William Collins Publishers Ltd, Auckland, New Zealand, .

External links
 Invertebrates. Department of Conservation.
 New Zealand Mollusca website
 Hamish G. Spencer, Richard C. Willan, Bruce A. Marshall & Tara J. Murray. 2004.  Checklist of the Recent Mollusca Described from the New Zealand Exclusive Economic Zone. - See also: Exclusive Economic Zone#New Zealand
 Sykes R. E. (1893) "On a new helicoid land-shell from New Zealand". Proceedings of the malacological society 1(3): 218. - Endodonta (Charopa) prestoni Murdoch.
 Land snail posters

Non Marine
Molluscs, Non
New Zealand, Non
New Zealand, Non
New Zealand